KAJB (channel 54) is a television station licensed to Calipatria, California, United States, serving the Yuma, Arizona–El Centro, California market as an affiliate of the Spanish-language UniMás network. It is owned by Calipatria Broadcasting Company, which maintains a joint sales agreement (JSA) which Entravision Communications, owner of El Centro–licensed Univision affiliate KVYE (channel 7), for the provision of certain services. Both stations share studios on North Imperial Avenue in El Centro, while KAJB's transmitter is located atop Black Mountain.

Technical information

Subchannels
The station's signal is multiplexed:

Analog-to-digital conversion
KAJB was originally assigned UHF channel 50 for its digital companion channel, however, with Mexican television station XHRCS-TV broadcasting on the same frequency from San Luis Rio Colorado, Sonora, KAJB could not build its facilities without causing interference. The station released its allocation and participated in the FCC second round elections, selecting UHF channel 36 for its digital allocation instead. After years of efforts to obtain Mexican coordination for the use of channel 36, KAJB was granted a construction permit to build digital facilities in August 2008, nearly nine years after requesting authorization, and began airing in March 2009. Through the use of PSIP, digital television receivers display the station's virtual channel as its former UHF analog channel 54, which was among the high band UHF channels (52-69) that were removed from broadcasting use as a result of the transition.

References

External links
 UniMás official website

Television channels and stations established in 2000
UniMás network affiliates
LATV affiliates
2000 establishments in California
AJB
AJB
Entravision Communications stations